Thomas A. Cotton was a state legislator in Mississippi. He represented Noxubee County in the Mississippi House of Representatives in 1874 and 1875.

Historican Eric Foner lists him as P. A. Cotton in Freedom's Lawmakers and documents him as African American, illiterate, and a laborer.

See also
African-American officeholders during and following the Reconstruction era

References

Date of birth missing
Date of death missing
Mississippi politicians
African-American politicians during the Reconstruction Era